Eino Hjalmar Kuvaja (17 June 1906 – 11 December 1975) was a Finnish Major and skier.

Kuvaja was born in Kuopio. He was the leader of the national Olympic military patrol teams in 1928 and in 1936 which reached second places.

External links 
 Combat Unit Kiiskinen’s reconnaissance mission on Karelian Isthmus on December 15, 1943

1906 births
1975 deaths
People from Kuopio
Finnish military patrol (sport) runners
Olympic biathletes of Finland
Military patrol competitors at the 1928 Winter Olympics
Military patrol competitors at the 1936 Winter Olympics
Finnish military personnel of World War II
Knights of the Mannerheim Cross
Sportspeople from North Savo